Miss USA 1960 was the 9th Miss USA pageant, won by Linda Bement of Utah who later became Miss Universe 1960. She was crowned by Miss USA 1959, Terry Huntingdon of California. This was Utah's first Miss USA win and Utah became the first state to have two titleholders, after Charlotte Sheffield was named Miss USA 1957 following the disqualification of Mary Leona Gage.

Bement's crowning victory meant she had simultaneous Miss Universe and Miss USA titles, this was last time to do so up until became a separate independent production from Miss Universe beginning in 1965.

Results

Historical significance 
 Utah wins competition for the second time. Incidentally, Bement went on to become the third woman from the USA to win the Miss Universe title in 1960.
 New York earns the 1st runner-up position for the second time. The last time it placed this was in 1954.
 Alabama earns the 2nd runner-up position for the third time. The last time it placed this was in 1958.
 North Carolina earns the 3rd runner-up position for the first time. 
 Florida earns the 4th runner-up position for the first time.
 States that placed in semifinals the previous year were Alabama, California, Florida, Iowa, Louisiana, Missouri, New York and West Virginia.
 California and New York placed for the fourth consecutive year. 
 Alabama, Florida and Louisiana placed for the third consecutive year. 
 Iowa, Missouri and West Virginia made their second consecutive placement.
 Utah last placed in 1958.
 Massachusetts and Ohio last placed in 1957.
 Michigan, New Jersey and North Carolina last placed in 1956.
 Connecticut last placed in 1954.
 Georgia breaks an ongoing streak of placements since 1958.
 Texas breaks an ongoing streak of placements since 1953.

Delegates
The Miss USA 1960 delegates were:

 Alabama – Margaret Gordon
 Alaska – Evelyn Bly
 Arizona – Virginia Crook
 Arkansas – Gene Chambers
 California – Teri Janssen
 Colorado – Karen Eickermann
 Connecticut – Joyce Trautwig
 Delaware – Rose Anne Reed
 District of Columbia – Doris Lee Jones
 Florida – Nancy Wakefiled
 Georgia – Cecilia Upton
 Hawaii – Gordean Lee (withdrew from competition)
 Idaho – Margie Davis
 Illinois – Patricia Thompson
 Indiana – June Cochran
 Iowa – Trudy Shulkin
 Kansas – Peggy Patterson
 Kentucky – Barbara Joan Lovins
 Louisiana – Judy Fletcher
 Maine – Terry Suzanne Tripp
 Maryland – Jerri Fiorilli
 Massachusetts – Barbara Feldman
 Michigan – Judith Richards
 Missouri – Marilyn Jean Stalcup
 Montana – Joanne Lane
 New Hampshire – Joan Joyce Chesleing
 New Jersey – Sandy Chudy
 New Mexico – Kaye Smith
 New York – Mary Rodite
 North Carolina – Lyndia Ann Tarleton
 North Dakota – Twila Fleckton
 Ohio – Corrine Huff
 Oklahoma – Suzanna Moore
 Pennsylvania – Betsy Reeves
 Rhode Island – Lorelie Sue White
 South Carolina – Margaret Thompson
 South Dakota – Patricia Klith
 Tennessee – Christine McSwain
 Texas – Pat Cloud
 Utah – Linda Bement
 Vermont – Carole Mary Demas
 Virginia – Elizabeth Betty Noreen Fulford
 West Virginia – Garnett Pugh
 Wisconsin – Sharyn Chalik
 Wyoming – Anita Simon

No state delegates sent: Minnesota, Mississippi, Nebraska, Nevada, Oregon and Washington.

See also 
Miss Universe 1960

External links
Miss USA official website
Pageantopolis - Official results of Miss USA 1952-1971

1960
1960 in the United States
1960 beauty pageants
1960 in Florida